Marine Isotope Stage 5 or MIS 5 is a marine isotope stage in the geologic temperature record, between 130,000 and 80,000 years ago. Sub-stage MIS 5e, called the Eemian or Ipswichian, covers the last major interglacial period before the Holocene, which extends to the present day. Interglacial periods which occurred during the Pleistocene are investigated to better understand present and future climate variability. Thus, the present interglacial, the Holocene, is compared with MIS 5 or the interglacials of Marine Isotope Stage 11.

Substages 
MIS 5, is divided into substages, divided alphabetically or with a numeric system for referring to "horizons" (events rather than periods), with MIS 5.5 representing the peak point of MIS 5e, and 5.51, 5.52 etc. representing the peaks and troughs of the record at a still more detailed level.

Marine Isotope Stage (MIS) 5e 

Marine Isotope Stage (MIS) 5e, called the Eemian (Ipswichian in Britain) around 124,000–119,000 years ago, was the last interglacial period before the present (Holocene), and compared global mean surface temperatures were at least 2 °C warmer. Mean sea level was 4–6 m higher than at present, following reductions of the Greenland ice sheet. Fossil reef proxies indicate sea level fluctuations of up to 10 m around the mean. Based on the data obtained from stable oxygen isotopes of planktonic foraminifera and age constraints from corals, estimates suggest average rates of sea-level rise of 1.6 m per century. The findings are important to understand current climate change, because global mean temperatures during MIS-5e were similar to the projected climate change today.

A 2015 study by sea level rise experts concluded that based on MIS 5e data, sea level rise could accelerate in the coming decades, with a doubling time of 10, 20 or 40 years. The study abstract explains: 

A 2018 study based on cave formations in the Mediterranean Sea found sea level rise of up to 6 meters, noting "The results suggest that if the pre-industrial temperature will be surpassed by 1.5 to 2°C, sea level will respond and rise 2 to 6 meters (7 to 20 feet) above present sea level." Evidence from Bahamas and Bermuda suggest powerful storm activity at the time, strong enough for wave-transported megaboulders, lowland chevron storm ridges, and wave runup deposits.

Other sub-stages
The Eemian was followed by a sharp decline in temperature around 116,000 years ago and the warmer MIS 5c,from around 100,000 years ago,  probably the period known as the Chelford Interstadial in Britain. Cooling from around 90,000 years ago was followed by the warmer MIS 5a, around 80,000 years ago, called in Britain the Brimpton Interstadial.

See also 
 Meltwater pulse 1A
 Paleothermometer
 Proxy (climate) 
 Timeline of glaciation

References

 MIS 05
Glaciology
Paleoclimatology
Paleogeography
Paleoceanography
Interglacials